is a Japanese manga artist. He is best known for his manga series Yakitate!! Japan, for which he won the Shogakukan Manga Award for shōnen in 2004. Hashiguchi won a newcomer's award in 1987 (published in a magazine), and Combat Teacher debuted the following year in the same magazine.

A prevailing theme seen throughout his manga is the realization of childhood dreams, such as making bread in Yakitate!! Japan or becoming a yo-yo master in Super Yo-Yo. Hashiguchi mainly focuses on unusual occupations or sports.

He enjoys comedy as well, and took a brief interlude from drawing to try his luck as a comedian.

Works
His works include:
 Combat Teacher (1988)
 Kinniku Kurabu (1991)
 Chie-Baachan No Chiebukuro (1992)
 Suto Ii Bashuko! Yon-Koma Gag Gaiden (1993)
 Caster Mairu Zo (1995)
 Windmill (1997)
 Super Yo-Yo (1997)
 Scissors (2000)
 Yakitate!! Japan (2002)
 Saijō no Meii (2007)
 Saijō no Meii: King of Neet (2010)

References

Manga artists from Tokyo
1967 births
Living people
People from Tokyo